KakaoMusic (Hangul: 카카오뮤직) was a music streaming service launched by Kakao. It lets users stream and buy music while also allowing them to share songs and connect with friends through KakaoTalk. In 2017, Kakao merged Kakao Music into Melon, the company’s other music streaming service.

Features
People can create their own music rooms where friends can listen to their collection of songs and leave comments. It also lets users set background music to their pages on KakaoTalk and KakaoStory. As part of their push to try to re-enter the Japanese market, Kakao will be launching their music service in Japan to complement KakaoTalk, Kakao T, and Piccoma.

As for 2021, the market share of Kakao Music is 3.05%, behind Melon (37.28%), Genie Music (19.24%), YouTube Music (19.22%) and Naver Vibe (4.08%).

See also 

 Kakao
 Kako M
 Melon

References

External links
Official website
Sharing site

Kakao
South Korean brands
2013 establishments in South Korea
Music streaming services